Illuminate is the second album by the Dutch rock band Destine. It was released March 30, 2012, and the same date on iTunes. Three of the songs were released before the album as singles (Stay, Thousand Miles and Night Skies) and music video of Stay and Thousand Miles is available on YouTube.

Track listing

Personnel

Destine
 Robin van Loenen - lead vocals, rhythm guitar
 Hubrecht Eversdijk - lead guitar, backing vocals
 Laurens Troost - keyboards, synthesizers, backing vocals
 Tom Vorstius Kruijff - bass guitar, backing vocals
 Jordy Datema - drums
Production
 James Paul Wisner - production, mixing
 David Bendeth - mixing
 Troy Glessner - masterting

Charts

Release history

References

2012 albums
Destine albums
Albums produced by James Paul Wisner